"Sit Still, Look Pretty" is a song by American singer Daya. It was released on September 4, 2015, as the second single from her debut extended play (EP), Daya (2015) and her debut studio album of the same name (2016). It is the follow-up to her Billboard Hot 100 top 40 hit "Hide Away". The song was written by Gino Barletta, Mike Campbell and Britten Newbill. Lyrically, the song includes themes of female empowerment.

"Sit Still, Look Pretty" debuted at number 100 on the Billboard Hot 100, and has since peaked at number 28. The single has also charted in Canada, Slovakia, and Czech Republic. A lyric video for the song was released on March 6, 2016. The music video for the song was released on MTV on September 9, 2016. The song was nominated for an Ardy at the 2017 Radio Disney Music Awards for Best Song of the Year. The song has also been used in Pitch Perfect 3, where actress Hailee Steinfeld provided the lead vocals.

Background
In an interview with Entertainment Weekly, Daya stated "It's about being a girl that goes after her own dreams and really fights for what she wants, and not letting anyone get in the way of that. It's important for young girls to know that they don't have to act a certain way or depend on someone for happiness. They can find all of that within themselves." Daya also said in an interview with Idolator, "I think it's just about not being an accessory for someone else. Just having your own dreams and goals. Going after them and not having to always try to please someone."

Critical reception
Dana Getz of Entertainment Weekly writes it "relegates [good boys] to the sidelines" and further labeled it a "bouncy, eff–you jaunt". Idolators Mike Wass calls the chorus "empowering" and stated "['Sit Still, Look Pretty'] picks up where 'Hide Away' left off — in that it's a little rebellious and a lot relatable." Billboard ranked "Sit Still, Look Pretty" at number 47 on their "100 Best Pop Songs of 2016" list.

Music video
A music video for the song was released on September 9, 2016.

Charts

Weekly charts

Year-end charts

Certifications

Release history

References

2015 songs
2016 singles
Daya (singer) songs
Songs with feminist themes
Songs written by Gino Barletta